The  is a historic hotel in Miyanoshita in Hakone, Kanagawa, Japan.

History 
The hotel was constructed in 1891 and consists of different sections constructed in a mixture of traditional Japanese and western architecture that was popular during the Meiji period. Many famous guests have stayed there, including Archduke Franz Ferdinand of Austria on his tour of Japan in 1893, and John Lennon and Yoko Ono with their son Sean in 1978.

The group hotel "Fuji View Hotel" in Kawaguchi-ko was a refuge for German Embassy after 1945 in World War II, including German Ambassador Heinrich Georg Stahmer. On September 6, 1945, agents of the US Counter-Intelligence Corps arrested Gestapo Colonel Josef Albert Meisinger there.

Publications 
Starting in 1934, the hotel in collaboration with Yamagata Corporation published a series of three books on Japanese customs, with the final volume published in 1949. The three volumes were subsequently bound into one, under the title We Japanese: Being Descriptions of Many of the Customs, Manners, Ceremonies, Festivals, Arts and Crafts of the Japanese, Besides Numerous Other Subjects. Editions were released at least until 1950.

The Fujiya Hotel (both in the 1950s and the present day) is the location for the best selling novel An Exquisite Sense of What is Beautiful by J. David Simons. The author stayed at the hotel several times during the seven years he spent in Japan in the 1990s.

Gallery

See also 
 Nara Hotel
 Hōshi Ryokan
 Dōgo Onsen

References

External links

 

Hotels in Kanagawa Prefecture
Hotels established in 1891
Buildings and structures in Hakone, Kanagawa
Japanese companies established in 1891
Buildings of the Meiji period